Daniel Logan Laidlaw VC (26 July 1875 – 2 June 1950), nicknamed "The Piper of Loos", was a Scottish soldier and recipient of the Victoria Cross (VC), the highest and most prestigious award for gallantry in the face of the enemy that can be awarded to British and Commonwealth forces, for his actions during the Battle of Loos in the First World War.

Only one other piper was awarded a VC during the First World War, the Scottish-born Canadian soldier James Cleland Richardson.

Early life
Laidlaw was born at Little Swinton, Berwickshire on 26 July 1875 and joined the Army in 1896. He served with the Durham Light Infantry in India where he received a certificate for his work during the Bombay plague epidemic of 1898. He then transferred as a piper to the King's Own Scottish Borderers, and in 1912 he transferred to the reserve.

First World War

Laidlaw re-enlisted on 7 September 1914 and was appointed acting Corporal before leaving to serve in France in February 1915.

Laidlaw was 40 years old, and a piper in the 7th Battalion, The King's Own Scottish Borderers, 15th (Scottish) Infantry Division, British Army during the Battle of Loos in September 1915 when the following deed took place for which he was awarded the VC.

Citation

He received the VC from King George V at Buckingham Palace in early 1916. This was followed by two promotions, to Corporal and then Lance Sergeant by the end of 1917. In the same year, the French awarded him the Croix de Guerre, which was commonly awarded to members of allied armed forces for heroic deeds. He was demobilised in April 1919 and transferred to the Class Z Reserve later that month.

Post war
After the war, Laidlaw returned to live in north Northumberland. In spite of his fame, he struggled to find regular work, and had long periods of unemployment. Just before the Second World War he became a sub-postmaster, and during the war served as a head ARP warden. He died at Shoresdean, near Berwick-upon-Tweed, on 2 June 1950, and was buried in St Cuthbert's churchyard, Norham, Northumberland.

Public reception
Dubbed the 'Piper of Loos' in the Scottish press, Laidlaw received more publicity than most contemporary VC recipients, both during and after the war. He played the pipes at various wartime concerts, while his portrait appeared in paintings, book illustrations and advertisements. Post-war, he piped at a number of formal events, including the interment of the Unknown Warrior in 1920; at the head of several marches to the Cenotaph, notably in 1932 when he marched beside pipe-sergeant George Findlater VC; and at the London victory parade of June 1945. He appeared as himself in two films about the First World War, The Guns of Loos (1929) and Forgotten Men (1933). Among other public appearances, he piped for the Scottish Country Dancing Club in London, and accompanied a troupe of highland dancers on a tour of Norway in 1934.

Further information
In April 1906 he married Georgina Mary Harvie at the Baptist Church, Alnwick, Northumberland. They had three sons and three daughters. 

His grandson, Victor, donated his Victoria Cross and other medals to National Museum of Scotland in Edinburgh Castle, where they are on display.

References

Monuments to Courage (David Harvey, 1999)
The Register of the Victoria Cross (This England, 1997)
Scotland's Forgotten Valour (Graham Ross, 1995)
VCs of the First World War - The Western Front 1915 (Peter F. Batchelor & Christopher Matson, 1999)

External links
Location of grave and VC medal (Northumberland)
"95th Anniversary, Loos"
Recording 'Laidlaw's Last Lament' song by David Kilpatrick, recorded 1999 anniversary in Kelso, Scotland
Footage of Laidlaw being interviewed and then playing his pipes

British World War I recipients of the Victoria Cross
Recipients of the Croix de Guerre 1914–1918 (France)
British Army personnel of World War I
Durham Light Infantry soldiers
King's Own Scottish Borderers soldiers
People from Berwickshire
1875 births
1950 deaths
Great Highland bagpipe players
British military musicians
British Army recipients of the Victoria Cross